Arahal is a municipality in Seville, Andalusia, Spain. It is situated on the southeast of Seville. This town is also known as "El Arahal", being recognized by this name until 1981. Ar-rahal is an Arabic term, meaning a place in the path where stopping to rest.

Monuments
There are several monuments in Arahal, most of them churches, including:

Nta.Sra. de la Victoria church. Temple finished in 1551 and the tower late XVII
Vera-Cruz church. 1602
Casa Peralta. 1895

Nta.Sra. del Rosario convent. 1608
San Roque church (ex-convent). 1624
Santo Cristo de la Misericordia church. 16th century
Santa María Magdalena parish-church. It is in the Neoclassical style and is one of the biggest in the province. It was built in 1800 after the 1755 Lisbon earthquake destroyed the old one, the tower remains from the previous temple.
San Antonio hermitage. 17th century.

Climate
Arahal has a Mediterranean climate Csa according to the Köppen climate classification, it is characterized by its variable rainfall, dry summers and extremely hot summers and mild winters and often rainy. One of the official historical higher temperatures was record in Arahal when the thermometer reached 49 °C on the shade on July 23, 1995, according to the Statistical Yearbook of Andalusia, the INM and AEMET. Arahal has a weather station located at Moron Air Base, station data represents the climate of arahal, in operation since 1951.

References

Municipalities of the Province of Seville